The 2005–06 Ukrainian First League is the fifteenth since its establishment. There were 20 teams competing. Two teams were relegated from the 2004–05 Vyshcha Liha. Four teams were promoted from the 2004–05 Ukrainian Second League.

Teams 
In 2005-06 season, the Ukrainian First League consists of the following teams:

Promoted teams 
These four teams were promoted from Druha Liha at the start of the season:

Group A 
 FC Enerhetyk Burshtyn – runner up (debut, promoted ahead of the winner FC Rava Rava-Ruska)
 FC Bershad – 5th place (debut, last minute swap for the withdrawn FC Nyva Vinnytsia)

Group B 
 FC Krymteplytsia Molodizhne – winners (debut)

Group C 
 FC Helios Kharkiv – winners (debut)

Relegated teams 
Two teams were relegated from the Vyshcha Liha season:
 FC Obolon Kyiv – 15th placed (returning after three seasons)
 FC Borysfen Boryspil – 16th placed (returning after two seasons)

Withdrawn teams 
 FC Nyva Vinnytsia announced that it withdraws from the league just before the season's start.

Location

Final table 

 FC Nyva Vinnytsia (5th Persha Liha 2004-05) merged its operations with FC Bershad' (5th Druha Liha Hrupa A 2004-05) and moved to Bershad' and renamed the club prior to the start of the season. Three points deducted from FC Bershad for failure to comply with Federation directives (12/16/2005) and another 6 points (9 total) deducted for continual nonconformance of League directives (2/24/2006) Informed the UFF that the team is dissolved and will not play any more matches. (May 19, 2006)

Top scorers 
Statistics are taken from here.

References

External links 
  Persha Liha at Official Site of the Professional Football league of Ukraine

Ukrainian First League seasons
2005–06 in Ukrainian association football leagues
Ukra